Whitechurch, is a small suburban area on the south side of Dublin, situated south of Ballyboden, east of Edmondstown and west of Marlay Park. The greater part of the area lies north of the M50 semi-orbital motorway, with some remote parts merging into the mountainous districts of Tibradden and Kilmashogue south of the road, all at the foot of the Dublin mountains. Whitechurch is usually considered to lie within the greater Rathfarnham area.

The name of the area is derived its name from a small white church in Kilmashogue, built near an ancient cairn (which is a protected monument). Little remains of the church.

The Church of Ireland parish of Whitechurch includes most of Rathfarnham including Tibradden, Larch Hill and Kilmashogue. There is a Moravian cemetery in the area which was the burial ground for the Moravian community, a Protestant sect from what is now the Czech republic that arrived in Ireland in the 18th century. This community had a church in Kevin St but has now died out.  The Catholic order, the Augustinian Fathers, have had a presence in the area for many years.

A Carnegie library was built in Whitechurch in 1911, and with little change, continues to function.

There are 3 schools located in Whitechurch. Firstly, there is St. Columba’s College, a private mostly boarding secondary school. There are also two primary schools. Whitechurch National School is a Church of Ireland primary school connected with Whitechurch Parish and Scoil Mhuire National School is a Roman Catholic primary school linked to the Good Counsel Parish, Ballyboden.

See also
List of towns and villages in Ireland

References

Rathfarnham
Towns and villages in South Dublin (county)
Church of Ireland parishes in the Republic of Ireland
Civil parishes of Rathdown, County Dublin